Hickory Creek (also known as Hickory Branch) is a stream in Clark County in the U.S. state of Missouri. It is a tributary of the Little Wyaconda River.

Hickory Creek was named for the hickory timber along its course.

See also
List of rivers of Missouri

References

Rivers of Clark County, Missouri
Rivers of Missouri